Founded in July, 2002, Vietnam National University, Hanoi – International School (VNU-IS) is one of the affiliated members of Vietnam National University, Hanoi to deliver joint training programs in English at undergraduate and graduate levels. Programs with degrees awarded by Vietnam National University, Hanoi (VNU) are designed in accordance with academic standards of prestigious foreign universities and approved by Vietnam National University, Hanoi.

General information 
All the training programs with degrees awarded by foreign universities are accredited by authorized accreditation agencies in residential countries and approved by the Ministry of Education and Training of Vietnam. Graduating from VNU-IS programs, students are highly appreciated by labour market and have high-paid jobs as well as good promotion.

Mission 

To conduct training and research activities in foreign languages according to international standards on the basis of fundamental and applied science as well as technology transfer in order to provide highly qualified human resources and scientific services and for the country’s socio-economic development.

Organizational structure 

Rectors and Vice-Rectors

Rector: Assoc. Prof. Dr. Le Trung Thanh

Vice-Rector: Assoc. Prof. Dr. Nguyen Van Dinh

Vice-Rector: Dr. Tran Anh Hao

Functional units 

Office of Academic and Student Affairs

Office of Personnel and Administrative Affairs

Office of Research & Partnership Development

Office of Planning & Finance

Academic departments 

Department of Social Sciences - Management and Economics

Department of Science & Technology

Department of Preuniversity Training

Service and Supporting Units

Centre for Globalization Research, Consulting & Orientation Service

Centre of Quality Assurance and Testing

Vietnam National University, Hanoi